Chen Shi (陳寔) (104 - 16 September 186), courtesy name Zhonggong (仲弓), was an official of the Eastern Han dynasty of China.

Life
Chen Shi was the father of Chen Ji and the paternal grandfather of Chen Qun. As he was the mayor of Taiqiu County, he was also known as Chen Taiqiu. He was the primogenitor of surname Chen of Yingchuan and the central figure of the Qingliu school in the Yingchuan region.

Though he was raised at an impoverished family, he loved books and studies at early years. As he was the person of rightfulness, without prejudice and generous, he was held in high repute among the common people. However, as he objected to the eunuchs' abuse of power, he was prevented from holding government positions by the Disasters of Partisan Prohibitions. As he was prevented from government services, he lived a hermit life at his hometown. Whenever a civil lawsuit occurred, local residents used to invite him to preside over the case. Whenever consulted, Chen Shi provided them with results that are consistent with reason, and no one complained about his judgement. It was said that "Better to have your punishment increased, than to be found lacking by Master Chen."..

In the 160s, when a teenage Xu Shao went to Yingchuan Commandery (潁川郡; covering present-day southern and central Henan), he visited and mingled with many reputable men in the region, except for Chen Shi. Later, when Chen Fan's wife died, many people attended her funeral, but Xu Shao did not show up. When asked, Xu Shao replied, "Taiqiu is too well-acquainted, it's difficult for him to be thorough; Zhongju (Chen Fan's courtesy name) is a serious person who hardly makes compromises. These are the reasons why I didn't visit them."

After the Prohibitions were relieved, He Jin sent a messenger and called Chen Shi to his ministration, but Chen Shi did not accept He Jin's offer and died soon after.

When he died in September 186, a crowd exceeding 30,000 assembled at his funeral, and those who wore mourning dress numbered in the hundreds. He was given the posthumous name Master Wenfan (文范先生).

Descendants 
Chen Baxian, the founding emperor of the Chen dynasty, traces his ancestry to Chen Shi. The Buddhist monk Chen Hui or Xuanzang also descends from Chen Shi.

See also 
 Emperor Wu of Chen
 Xuanzang (Chen Hui)

References

 Fan, Ye (5th century). Book of the Later Han (Houhanshu).

104 births
187 deaths
Han dynasty politicians from Henan
Politicians from Xuchang